The Metropolitan Correctional Center, Chicago (MCC Chicago) is a United States federal prison in Chicago, Illinois, which holds male and female prisoners of all security levels prior to and during court proceedings in the Northern District of Illinois, as well as inmates serving brief sentences. It is operated by the Federal Bureau of Prisons, a division of the United States Department of Justice.

History and design
MCC Chicago was designed by architect Harry Weese. Construction began in 1971 and the facility opened in 1975. The building is a right triangle shape, is 28 stories high, and has a rooftop exercise yard. The irregularly-spaced windows on each wall are reminiscent of old computer punchcards.

Several features make MCC Chicago's design unique from other federal prison facilities. The cells were originally designed to feel as comfortable as possible, based on sailboat cabins, with built-in hardwood beds and desks. Most of these features have since been removed.

Prison life
An exercise yard is available for inmates, located on the roof of the building. A recreation center in the basement provides fitness equipment on a regular schedule, along with a selection of board games. The leisure and law libraries are housed on the ninth floor along with classrooms and offices. There is a security housing unit (SHU) for male prisoners, while female prisoners needing to be isolated, as of 2005, have been taken to the Cook County Jail.

 women prisoners may visit the exercise room and law library once per week. The prison only allows male inmates, not females, to have prison jobs such as working in the prison kitchen. Piper Kerman, the author of Orange is the New Black, wrote that circa 2005 the institution was not responsive to the demands of the prisoners, who were in "misery", and that the prison guards, who were "often pleasant, if unprofessional", were unable to make meaningful change.

Notable inmates

Notable events

1985 escapes
In 1985, convicted murderers Bernard Welch and Hugh Colomb assembled the materials necessary to break open a window hole and gain egress from the MCC, escaping down a piecework rope to street level. They were eventually recaptured after a months-long nationwide manhunt.

2009 escape plot
In October 2009, Matthew Nolan (28750-045), brother of film director Christopher Nolan, assembled bedsheets and other materials for a foiled window escape plan that was later called "impossible" by the judge who sentenced Nolan to 14 months for the attempt. Nolan was being held at the MCC awaiting extradition to Costa Rica on a passport charge (his charges having been reduced from earlier capital offenses) at the time of the foiled plot.

Vicente Zambada-Niebla lawsuit
In February 2010, Sinaloa Cartel leader Vicente Zambada-Niebla was apprehended by Mexican police and extradited to Chicago to face trial. Considered a high security risk, he was placed in solitary confinement. Based on intelligence that allies of Zambada-Niebla were planning a helicopter escape, Zambada-Niebla was not allowed access to the rooftop exercise yard. Bureau of Prisons officials cited the fact that the Sinaloa Cartel has unlimited resources and has succeeded in both escapes and assassinations in the past. Zambada-Niebla sued the Bureau of Prisons in 2011 claiming that his being denied exercise constituted cruel and unusual punishment. In September 2011, US District Judge Ruben Castillo ruled that since Zambada-Niebla had not been convicted, placing him in solitary confinement was unwarranted. In order to comply with the ruling and alleviate security concerns, the Bureau of Prisons transferred Zambada-Niebla to the Federal Correctional Institution, Milan, a medium-security facility in Michigan which has a ground-level exercise area.

2012 escape
In the early morning hours of December 18, 2012, two convicted bank robbers, Kenneth Conley (28560-298) and Joseph "Jose" Banks (22652-424), escaped the secure facility. Conley and Banks were being housed in the MCC while awaiting sentencing on their bank robbery convictions, crimes which were unrelated beyond the pair being cellmates at the MCC. The escape by Banks and Conley was the first from any secure federal correctional facility since April 2006, when convicted murderer Richard Lee McNair escaped from the U.S. Penitentiary, Pollock, Louisiana. The pair ostensibly fashioned a rope from bedsheets or fabric scraps, and exited their 17th-floor cell through a hole created at the bottom of a narrow window slot, rappelling down the side of the MCC to the street below.

Their escape and the gaping hole in the prison wall apparently went unnoticed during routine overnight bed checks, and was only discovered when arriving jail workers spotted the rope dangling down the side of the MCC at about 7:00 am. The inmates had obtained and concealed large numbers of bedsheets, fake iron window bars used to mimic the real bars they removed and hid, passable street clothing, and bulky materials used to fool guards into believing they were asleep in bed. It is unclear what tools were used to create the hole in the wall necessary for the escape, and if these had been hidden in the cell for an extended period of time.

Conley and Banks were subsequently recorded on a nearby video security system as they entered a cab at the corner of Congress Parkway and Michigan Avenue at about 2:40 am. In the video, they were wearing some form of light-colored plain clothes, and not their bright-orange, prison-issue jumpsuits. The identity of the cab driver and cab company, as well as how the convicts paid the cab fare, remained unclear.

On December 20, 2012, Banks was recaptured by FBI agents and the Chicago police in the 2300 block of North Bosworth Avenue. On January 3, 2013, Conley was apprehended in Palos Hills, Illinois. Conley and Banks are currently incarcerated at Florence ADX, the supermax facility in Colorado which holds the most dangerous inmates in the federal system, as well as inmates who constitute a high escape risk. Their release dates are in 2032 and 2040. Banks filed a $10 million lawsuit in 2014 for negligence for allowing him to escape. The lawsuit was dismissed by the 7th Circuit Court of Appeals.

See also

List of U.S. federal prisons
Federal Bureau of Prisons
Incarceration in the United States

References

Further reading

External links

 MCC Chicago at the Federal Bureau of Prisons website

Chicago
Chicago
Women's prisons in Illinois
Buildings and structures in Chicago
Harry Weese buildings
1975 establishments in Illinois